During the 1980–81 English football season, AFC Bournemouth competed in the Football League Fourth Division.

Final league table

Results
Bournemouth's score comes first

Legend

Football League Third Division

FA Cup

League Cup

Squad

References

AFC Bournemouth seasons